Lamin Mbergan (born 1997) is a Swedish rapper of Gambian origin, better known by the mononym Lamix stylized as LAMIX and was also known as LMFamous. In 2018, he released his debut EP Ingen som hör that charted on Sverigetopplistan, the official Swedish Albums Chart. His hit song "Hey Baby" produced by Pablo Paz was his debut hit reaching number 21 on the Swedish Singles Chart and staying 44 weeks on the chart.

Lamix was nominated for the Swedish Grammy for "Song of the Year" and also nominated for P3 Guld's "Artist of the Future" award. He has collaborated with a number of artists, most notably Jireel.

Discography

Albums

EPs

Singles

As lead artist

Notes

As featured artist

References

External links
Facebook

Swedish rappers
1997 births
Living people
Swedish people of Ghanaian descent